Lead climbing competitions at the 2021 IFSC Climbing World Cup were held at five locations, from 23 June to 4 September 2021. The International Federation of Sport Climbing had initially scheduled six lead climbing events concluding on 17 October, but COVID-19 travel restrictions resulted in the cancellation of event in Xiamen, China.

The top three in each competition received medals, and at the end of the season, the overall winners were awarded trophies. The overall winners were determined based upon points, which athletes were awarded for finishing in the top 30 of each individual event. Stefano Ghisolfi won the men's seasonal title, Janja Garnbret won the women's seasonal title, and Slovenia won the national team title.

Overview 

* Chief route-setters are in bold.

Overall ranking 
The overall ranking is determined based upon points, which athletes are awarded for finishing in the top 30 of each individual event. There are five competitions in the season. The national ranking is the sum of the points of that country's three best male and female athletes. Results displayed in parentheses are not counted.

Men 
The results of the ten most successful athletes of the Lead World Cup 2021:

Women 
The results of the ten most successful athletes of the Lead World Cup 2021:

National Teams 
The results of the ten most successful countries of the Lead World Cup 2021:

Country names as used by the IFSC

Innsbruck, Austria (June, 23–26)

Men 
99 men competed in the event.

Italy's Stefano Ghisolfi set an early high-point in the final which could only be surpassed by Austria's Jakob Schubert who took first place in front of his home crowd. Switzerland's Sascha Lehmann took third place after pushing Japan's Masahiro Higuchi to fourth place on count-back. Czech Republic's superstar Adam Ondra slipped low down on the final route and placed 8th.

Women 
75 women competed in the event.

Slovenia's Janja Garnbret claimed the only top on the final route, claiming the win. USA's Brooke Raboutou placed second while Japan's Akiyo Noguchi placed third.

Villars, Switzerland (July, 1–3)

Men 
68 men competed in the event.

USA's Sean Bailey won the gold medal. Germany's Alexander Megos took second while USA's Colin Duffy took third.

Women 
53 women competed in the event.

Slovenia's Janja Garnbret topped all the routes in the competition, taking the win. Italy's Laura Rogora also topped the final route, but took silver due to count-back. USA's Natalia Grossman took bronze.

Chamonix, France (July, 12–13)

Men 
73 men competed in the event.

USA's Sean Bailey claimed his second win in the Lead World Cup. Italy's Stefano Ghisolfi and Czech Republic's Martin Stráník fell at the same crux in the final round and placed second and third respectively on count-back.

Women 
62 women competed in the event.

Italy's Laura Rogora topped three out of four routes in the competition, earning her a gold medal. USA's Natalia Grossman placed second while Bulgaria's Aleksandra Totkova placed third.

Briançon, France (July, 17–18)

Men 
68 men competed in the event.

Italy's Stefano Ghisolfi fell high on the head-wall and won the gold medal. Russia's Dmitrii Fakirianov and Czech Republic's Martin Stráník placed second and third respectively.

Women 
56 women competed in the event.

Czech Republic's Eliška Adamovská claimed her first gold medal. USA's Natalia Grossman placed second while Slovenia's Vita Lukan placed third.

Kranj, Slovenia (September, 3–4)

Men 
61 men competed in the event.

Japan's Masahiro Higuchi won his first World Cup gold medal. Slovenia's Luka Potočar placed second and Germany's Sebastian Halenke placed second and third respectively on count-back. Italy's Stefano Ghisolfi, placing 12th in the competition, was crowned this season overall Lead World Cup champion.

Women 
45 women competed in the event.

Slovenia's Janja Garnbret, back from the 2020 Tokyo Olympics, claimed the gold medal and by doing so also claimed the overall Lead World Cup title. South Korea's Chaehyun Seo claimed silver while USA's Natalia Grossman claimed bronze.

References 

IFSC Climbing World Cup
2021 in sport climbing